XHAFQ-FM is a radio station on 88.5 FM in Cosoleacaque and Minatitlán, Veracruz. The station is owned by Grupo Radiorama and is known as La Súper Q with a pop format.

History

XEJV-AM 1420 received its concession on June 29, 1967. It was owned by Arnulfo Aguirre Salamanca and broadcast from facilities in Jaltipan with 1,000 watts day and 250 night. In 1973, Aguirre sold to Laura Escamilla de Martínez, and in the 1990s, XEJV became XEAFQ-AM. The station was later owned by Laura Escamilla Decuir prior to its sale to Radiorama.

XEAFQ was cleared for AM-FM migration in 2010 as XHAFQ-FM 88.5.

The last brands that the station had are Mariachi Stereo, Romántica, Vida Romántica, Love FM and La Super Q.

References

Radio stations in Veracruz
Radio stations established in 1967